Chupaun kaise laga chunri mein daag is an Indian television drama series that aired on DD National in 2014.The series, starring Nimai Bali, Sachhin Chhabra, Jinal Belani, Sonia Shah and Homi Wadia, was directed and produced by Rupesh D Gohil. Chupaun kaise laga chunri mein daag is a Love Story of a small town girl from bhopal who fails in Love with Bollywood Superstar Prem Nanda and her journey to become a Bollywood Actress.

Cast 
 Nimai Bali
 Sachin Chhabra
 Jinal Belani
 Sonia Shah
 Homi Wadia

References

External links 
 Official Website of Chupaun kaise laga chunri mein daag
 IMDB
 DD National Promo

DD National original programming
2014 Indian television series debuts